The humpback chub (Gila cypha) is a federally protected fish that lived originally in fast waters of the Colorado River system in the United States. This species takes its name from the prominent hump between the head and dorsal fin, which is thought to direct the flow of water over the body and help maintain body position in the swift currents of the Colorado. The body is almost entirely scaleless, retaining only about 80 mid-lateral scales along the lateral line. The fish is very streamlined, with a thin caudal peduncle and a deeply forked tail. The back is a light olive gray, the sides silver, and the belly white. The dorsal fin usually has nine rays, and the anal fin 10 or more. Maximum recorded length is 38 cm.

The humpback chub mostly consumes invertebrates and, to a lesser extent, other fish. They feed at all levels from the bottom to the surface. The species spawns from April through June, at water temperatures of 19-21 °C. The males develop nuptial tubercles on the head and paired fins. The fish spawn in slower-moving backwaters, typically over a substrate of cobbles or boulders. Young fish stay near shore and in quiet areas, preferring slightly more turbid water.

The humpback chub's population in the Colorado has been reduced dramatically, primarily due to habitat loss, such as the construction of Glen Canyon Dam. The fish's status as an endangered species has inspired a number of costly and controversial management measures, such as altering the operation of Glen Canyon Dam and removal of non-native predators.

Description
The humpback chub has a streamlined body, with a concave skull on its dorsum. The caudal peduncle is thin and somewhat pencil-like but not greatly elongated, where the length of the caudle peduncle divided by length of head is less than 1.0. The head length divided by the caudal peduncle is less than 5.0. The scales are embedded deeply across the surface of the fish, especially on hump. The fins are large and curved, and the origin of the dorsal are about equidistant between the snout and caudal fin base. The mouth is inferior, and overhung by the snout. The pharyngeal arch is small, with a short lower ramus.

Range
The humpback chub historically ranged from below present-day Hoover Dam in the Colorado River upstream into Colorado, and in the larger portions of Colorado River tributaries in Arizona, Utah, Colorado, and Wyoming. Presently the species is restricted to six population centers in: 1) the Colorado and Little Colorado rivers in Grand Canyon, Arizona; 2) the Colorado River in Cataract Canyon, Utah; 3) the Colorado River in Black Rocks, Colorado, and Westwater Canyon, Utah; 4) the Green River in Desolation and Gray canyons, Utah; 5) the Green River in Dinosaur National Monument, Colorado and Utah; 6) and the Yampa River in Dinosaur National Monument, Colorado. The Humpback Chub is found in Arizona at and around Coconino County, Colorado and Little Colorado rivers in the Grand Canyon.

Habitat
In general, species persists only in turbulent, high gradient, canyon-bound reaches of large rivers in the Colorado River Basin. The young prefer shallow, low-velocity nearshore pools in the Little Colorado River, and progressively move to deeper, faster areas with increasing size and age. In the Colorado River in Grand Canyon, young-of-year are found in backwater and other near-shore, slow-velocity sites, with similar ontogenetic tendencies. Adults in the Colorado River in Grand Canyon and in the Upper Basin are associated with large eddy complexes. Humpback chub appear to be more active at night.

Parasites and diseases
The population in the Grand Canyon has been previously infested with the parasitic copepod Lernaea cyprinacea, and Asian tapeworm, Bothriocephalus acheilognathi. Kaeding and Zimmermann also reported 13 species of bacteria, six protozoans, and the fungus Saprolegnia to infect humpback chub.

Population trends 
The historic range of the humpback chub is uncertain, but the distribution was presumably more contiguous than in the present. There were possible populations in and below the Flaming Gorge that were likely destroyed by the poisoning of the Green River associated with the construction of the Flaming Gorge Reservoir. The fish's distribution within the Grand Canyon has contracted since the construction of Glen Canyon Dam.

For 2008 the total population of the humpback chub in the Grand Canyon is estimated at 6,000 to 10,000. This is a 50-percent increase over the estimation of 2001 and a reversal of the declining trend between 1989 and 2001. It seems that a combination of human causes and natural events stabilized the population, particularly the experimental flooding of the canyon and the increase in water temperatures due to draught conditions over the last decade.

Management and conservation 

Threats: altered hydrology and cold tailwater releases from reservoirs; Predation by and competition with nonnative fishes; and, parasitism.

Management Needs: ameliorate effects of reservoirs; ameliorate effects of nonnative fish and parasite sources in chub waters; monitor status of all populations. Also need to be concerned about genetic isolation of populations by dams.

The humpback chub's status as an endangered species has prompted elaborate and expensive programs to restore its numbers, largely by modifying the releases from Glen Canyon Dam, creating artificial floods to replicate historic conditions in the Colorado, and removal of non-native predators, such as rainbow trout.

Effective April 20, 1994, seven reaches of the Colorado River System (totaling 379 miles) were designated as Critical Habitat for Gila cypha. The Grand Canyon Protection Act of 1992 reduced stage fluctuation of water releases from Glen Canyon Dam. Glen Canyon Environmental Studies Phase I (1984–1987) and Phase II (1990–1995) research data used in development of Glen Canyon Dam Environmental Impact Statement and Biological Opinion. Upper Colorado River Basin Recovery and Implementation Plan guides recovery efforts for the species in the Upper Basin.

After the Colorado had been extensively modified by dams, the Little Colorado River became the fish's stronghold in Grand Canyon region. A second population is currently established in Shinumo Creek, another tributary to the Colorado River inside Grand Canyon National Park. The first 300 fish were released in Shinumo Creek in June 2009. Over the following two years additional young chubs will be released there.

Federal officials have tried a number of experimental releases from Glen Canyon Dam in an attempt to replicate historic conditions and restore sandbars, beaches, and backwaters downstream. The first flood began on March 26, 1996, when Interior Secretary Bruce Babbitt stood before a large gathering of media and opened the first of four outlet tubes to begin the imitation inundation. Initially, it appeared that the flood was a success, with sandbars and backwaters created downstream, but as the dam's operations returned to normal, the Colorado ate away at the new habitat and reversed the gains. Several other fake floods have been tried since 1996, with the releases now timed to coincide with an input of sediment from tributaries, but the results have been disappointing.

In recent years, the number of humpback chub in the Grand Canyon region has increased significantly, but the reasons are unclear. 
Removal of non-native fish near the confluence of the Little Colorado River and Colorado River may have helped the species, but at the same time, drought was lowering the level of Lake Powell and causing water released from Glen Canyon Dam to be much warmer than normal. Typically, water released from the dam is too cold for chub to reproduce.

Introduced smallmouth bass have been a predatory threat to humpback chub above the Glen Canyon Dam, but had not been able to get beyond Lake Powell.  But as of 2022, smallmouth bass have been found below Glen Canyon Dam, possibly as a result of the low water level at  Colorado River and Lake Powell.

References

 Tobin, Mitch. Endangered: Biodiversity on the Brink. Golden, CO: Fulcrum, 2010.
 William F. Sigler and John W. Sigler, Fishes of Utah (University of Utah Press, 1996), pp. 79–83

USFWS Environmental Conservation Online System page for Humpback chub
USFWS Upper Colorado Endangered Fish Recovery Program 
USFWS List of Fish Listed under Endangered Species Act
 National Park Service: Grand Canyon National Park − Humpback Chub Translocation Experiment in Shinumo Creek (accessed on 2009-09-01)

External links

  List of Arizona Native Fishes
  Arizona Desert Museum
 United States Fish and Wildlife Service Rule Reclassifying the Humpback Chub from Endangered to Threatened (2021)

Chubs (fish)
Gila (fish)
Fish of the Western United States
Cyprinid fish of North America
Endangered fish
Taxa named by Robert Rush Miller
Fish described in 1946
ESA endangered species
Freshwater fish of North America